World Hydrogen Energy Conference (WHEC) is a series of international events covering the complex issues of utilizing hydrogen as an energy carrier.  These include methods of production of hydrogen, materials for hydrogen storage, infrastructure development and hydrogen utilization technologies, particularly fuel cell system application. WHEC is held every two years at different locations around the world and, in combination with World Hydrogen Technology Conventions (WHTC), is organized with the support of International Association for Hydrogen Energy.

Past events

Upcoming events

References

Recurring events established in 1976
Academic conferences